131 is the fourth studio album by American rock band Emarosa. The album was released on July 8, 2016 through Hopeless Records and was produced by Casey Bates. It is the band's first album to be released on this label. It is also the last album to feature founding keyboardist Jordan Stewart and the first to feature rhythm guitarist Matthew Marcellus, who has been touring with the band since 2014. The sculpture image featuring on the album cover and also on other merchandise to promote the album is made by artist Beth Cavener.

Track listing

Personnel
Credits adapted from AllMusic.
Emarosa
 Bradley Walden – lead vocals
 ER White – lead guitar
 Matthew Marcellus – rhythm guitar, backing vocals
 Jordan Stewart – keyboards, programming

Additional musicians
 Ryan Kienle – bass
 Connor Denis – drums
 Amy Meeko – guest vocals on track 8
 Jason Vena of Acceptance – guest vocals on track 9
 Sean Mackin – strings

Additional personnel
 Casey Bates – production, engineering, mixing, mastering
 Jeremiah Sinopoli – engineering
 Beth Cavener – inspiration
 Chris Hansen – artwork, layout
 Megan Thompson – cover art

Charts

References

2016 albums
Hopeless Records albums
Emarosa albums